Avatiu–Ruatonga–Palmerston or RAPPA is a Cook Islands electoral division returning one member to the Cook Islands Parliament.

The electorate was created in 1981, when the Constitution Amendment (No. 9) Act 1980–1981 adjusted electorate boundaries and split the electorate of Te-au-o-tonga into four. It was further expanded in 1986 by the Constitution Amendment (No. 12) Act 1986. It consists of the tapere of Atupa, Avatiu and Ruatonga on the island of Rarotonga, as well as Palmerston Island.

Members of Parliament

References

Rarotonga
Cook Islands electorates